Fred E. Miller (1868 – 1936) was an American photographer, who worked at Crow Agency. He photographed mostly Crow Indians.

Miller's works, collected by his daughter, were published as Fred E. Miller: Photographer of the Crows in 1985.

References

American photographers
1868 births
1936 deaths
People from Crow Agency, Montana